Shehan Abeyptiya is a Sri Lankan  male athlete who won 3 gold medals at the 2008 Commonwealth Youth Games.

He also competed at the 2010 Commonwealth Games, making the semi-finals in the 100 and 200 metre events. Shehan Sadaruwan Ambepitiya (born 17 January 1990) is a sprinter from Sri Lanka who specializes in the 100 meters and 200 meters. Who won 3 gold medals at the 2008 Commonwealth Youth Games. Also he was a finalist in the World Junior Championship in 2007.

Ambepitiya represented Sri Lanka at the 2008 Commonwealth Youth Games, 2007 World Junior Championships, 2009 World Athletics Championship, 2010 Commonwealth Games, 2010 South Asian Games and the Asian Junior Athletics Championships.

Ambepitiya represented Sri Lanka at the 2008 World Junior Athletics Championships, 2008 Commonwealth Youth Games, 2008 Asian Junior Athletics Championships, 2009 World Athletics Championship, 2010 Commonwealth Games and the 2010 South Asian Games. In Commonwealth Youth Games he won 3 Gold medals with 3 new games records. also he was the first ever Sri Lankan to be a finalist in a World Junior Athletics Championships 2008. Also as a junior athlete he won the Asian Junior Silver medal for the 100m in the 2008.

Ambepitiya who is  considered as the fastest man in South Asia by winning the gold medal for the 100m in the South Asian Games 2010, Dakah. Ambepitiya made a strong start to the 2010 athletics season, recording a personal best timing of 10.31 seconds for 100m and 21.10 seconds in 2011 Asian Athletics Championships for his 200m. Ambepitiya who trained under Coach Sunil Gunawardena, Currently trains in Jamaica under coach Glean Mills who is the trainer of the world's fastest man Usain Bolt and the world champion Yohan Blake for his future events.

Shehan Ambepitiya studied in President's College, Kotte and Gateway College Colombo, and had contributed immensely to the schools athletic championships.

References

1990 births
Living people
Athletes (track and field) at the 2010 Commonwealth Games
Commonwealth Games competitors for Sri Lanka
Sri Lankan male sprinters
Athletes (track and field) at the 2018 Commonwealth Games
South Asian Games gold medalists for Sri Lanka
South Asian Games silver medalists for Sri Lanka
South Asian Games gold medalists in athletics
South Asian Games medalists in athletics